Andrew Wilmot (born 4 September 1980) is a British racing driver. In 2013, Wilmot competed in the British Touring Car Championship for the first time at Rockingham, driving for Team HARD in a Volkswagen CC NGTC. He returned to the championship in 2021, driving for Excelr8 Motorsport.

Racing career
Wilmot began his career in the  Ford Fiesta Championship in 2010. He switched to the Volkswagen Racing Cup GB for 2012, he finished fourteenth overall, with 186 points,. In September 2013, it was announced that Wilmot would make his British Touring Car Championship debut with Tony Gilham Racing replacing Tom Onslow-Cole. For the 2015 British Touring Car Championship season Wilmot moved to Welch Motorsport, driving a Proton Persona.

Racing record

Complete British Touring Car Championship results
(key) (Races in bold indicate pole position – 1 point awarded just in first race; races in italics indicate fastest lap – 1 point awarded all races; * signifies that driver led race for at least one lap – 1 point given all races)

References

External links
 Official website
 

1980 births
Living people
British Touring Car Championship drivers
English racing drivers
British racing drivers
Sportspeople from Kent
Ginetta GT4 Supercup drivers
Renault UK Clio Cup drivers
Mini Challenge UK drivers
Michelin Pilot Challenge drivers